Kwesi Abbensetts is a Guyanese photographer who lives in New York City.

Early life 
Abbensetts was raised in Guyana. His interest in filmmaking and photography came later in life, when he attended college in the United States.

Education
Abbensetts attended Montgomery College in Maryland. He learned photography through experimentation with a Pentax camera. In 2006, he earned a Bachelor of Arts in Filmmaking from Brooklyn College. Some of his early influences include filmmaker Spike Lee.

Awards 
Awards that Abbensetts has received include the NYFA Artist Fellowship, Darryl Foundation Emergency Grant, Third Horizon Film Festival Artist Award and Film Africa Artwork Competition.

Body of work
 Spaceship George

Exhibitions
 Surfaces, the Tropic Series, Jamaica, 2022

References

Guyanese photographers
Montgomery College alumni
Brooklyn College alumni
Photographers from New York City
Year of birth missing (living people)
Place of birth missing (living people)
Living people